Petru Bogatu (12 July 1951 – 22 March 2020) was a journalist, essayist, political analyst and writer from the Republic of Moldova, unionist and pro-occidental orientation, editorialist at the National Newspaper, professor at the State University of Moldova, Faculty of Journalism and Communication Sciences.

Together with six other experts from Romania, the Netherlands and the Republic of Moldova, Bogatu was co-author of the book "Twitter Revolution, First Episode: Republic of Moldova", which is a synthesis of the April 2009 anti-communist protests in data, images and investigations. He wrote the fiction novel The rope braided in three, a parable of police intrigue about the geopolitical confrontations from the beginning of the third millennium, seen from an ethical, teleological and historical perspective.

Biography 

Petru Bogatu was born on 12 July 1951 in Slobozia. He was a graduate of the Bălți Education Institute and a Rostov-on-Don institute. Bogatu was a journalist since 1975. He was a correspondent and then editor of Satul Nou, based in Slobozia (currently in the Transnistrian region); an editor, commentator, and deputy editor-in-chief at the Moldovan Public Television Moldova 1, deputy editor-in-chief of Ţara newspaper, political analyst and editor-in-chief at Flux newspaper. Bogatu also taught in the State University of Moldova's Department of Journalism and Communication Sciences.

He served as vice president of the Popular Front of Moldova (1990–1992). From 1995 until 2000, Bogatu was the most popular journalist in Moldova. Later he worked for Vocea Basarabiei (2009), Jurnal TV (2009). He left Jurnal Trust Media in September 2013.

Bogatu was also a political commentator and op-ed writer for the Ziarul Național newspaper. Since 2016 he was a producer and presenter of the TV program "Cronica lui Bogatu" on Prime TV channel.

He died on 22 March 2020, in Chișinău.

Controversy 
In October 2015 Petru Bogatu, as an op-ed columnist for Ziarul Național, wrote hard criticism of Vladimir Plahotniuc's address, stating that he [Plahotniuc] "has usurped the central country's administration", and "has subordindate to him prosecutora and judges, subjugating this way country's constitutional institutions. As a result, he transformed the state into a private firm, and the justice – into a gestapo for the intimidation and burial of his political opponents". Next year Bogatu began his work at Prime TV, a channel owned by Plahotniuc.

Books 
 2008 – "Investigative Journalism" (manual) 
 2012 – "Cord of Three Strands" (novel)

Notes

Bibliography 
 Republica Moldova: 50+1 jurnalişti

External links 
 PETRU BOGATU. Omul care ne face ordine în debaraua din cap
 Petru Bogatu's blog
 Petru Bogatu - ape.md

1951 births
2020 deaths
Popular Front of Moldova politicians
Moldovan journalists
Male journalists
Moldovan writers
Recipients of the Order of the Republic (Moldova)
Euronova Media Group
Jurnal Trust Media
Romanian people of Moldovan descent
Academic staff of Moldova State University